Protactinium(V) oxide is a chemical compound with the formula Pa2O5. When it is reduced with hydrogen, it forms PaO2. Aristid V. Grosse was first to prepare 2 mg of Pa2O5 in 1927. Pa2O5 does not dissolve in concentrated HNO3, but dissolves in HF and in a HF + H2SO4 mixture and reacts at high temperatures with solid oxides of alkali metal and alkaline earth metals.

As protactinium(V) oxide, like other protactinium compounds, is radioactive, toxic and very rare, it has very limited technological use. Mixed oxides of Nb, Mg, Ga and Mn, doped with 0.005–0.52% Pa2O5, have been
used as high temperature dielectrics (up to 1300 °C) for ceramic capacitors.

References

Oxides
Protactinium compounds